The 22nd Serbia Division (Serbo-Croatian Latin: Dvadesetdruga srpska divizija) was a Yugoslav Partisan division formed on 22 May 1944 as the 2nd Serbia Division. It was formed from three brigades, those being the 8th, 10th and 12th Serbia Brigades whose total strength was around 2,000 fighters. Commander of the division was Živojin Nikolić Brka while its political commissar was Vasilije Smajević.

References 

Divisions of the Yugoslav Partisans
Military units and formations established in 1944